Achasan station, also known as Rear Entrance to Seoul Children's Grand Park station, is a subway station on Line 5 of the Seoul Metropolitan Subway system. Located in Gwangjin-gu, in Seoul, South Korea the station is near the rear entrance of Seoul Children's Grand Park.

Station layout

References

Railway stations opened in 1995
Seoul Metropolitan Subway stations
Metro stations in Gwangjin District